Mary Chronopoulou (16 July 1933) is a Greek actress. She was one of the most popular actresses of the 1960s. She starred in many films, 16 of which were produced by Finos Film. She is one of the main protagonists of Greek theatre.

Films 
The Red Lanterns (1963) ..... Mary Pana
The Fear The film was  entered into the 16th Berlin International Film Festival and the 1966 Cannes Film Festival as the official Greek entry. (1966) ..... Mrs. Kanali
Without Identity
Visibility Zero (1970) ..... Christina Richter
Too Late For Tears (1968) ..... Eirini Katakouzinou
The Naked Brigade (1965) ..... Katina
Voyage to Cythera (1984) ..... Voula
A Lady at the Bouzoukia (1968) ..... Elena Apergi
Gorgones ke Manges (Mermaids and Lads) (1968) ..... Flora
Tears for Electra (1966) Lina Petridi
Royal Romance
Blood on the Land (1965) ..... Eirini
The Hunters (1977) ..... Mrs. Diamantis

Awards
Best actress award for Children of the Swallow.

References

External links 

1933 births
Living people
Greek actresses